Jacky Schoenaker (born 28 July 1988) is a Dutch hockey player who represents Netherlands in international matches. She made her international debut against Belgium on 14 July 2013 in a friendly match. She is also the daughter of former retired professional footballer Dick Schoenaker.

Career 
Jacky took up the sport of hockey at the age of six for Qui Vive club. She was called into the national side after being part of the victorious 2009 Women's Hockey Junior World Cup. She became a prominent member in the Dutch team since her debut in 2013 and was a key member of the Dutch side which claimed gold medal in 2012–13 Women's FIH Hockey World League and in the 2014 Women's Hockey World Cup.

References 

1988 births
Living people
Dutch female field hockey players
Sportspeople from Rotterdam
20th-century Dutch women
20th-century Dutch people
21st-century Dutch women